Kakanuiella is a genus of brachiopods belonging to the family Thecidellinidae.

The species of this genus are found in New Zealand.

Species:

Kakanuiella chathamensis 
Kakanuiella hedleyi

References

Brachiopod genera